In heat transfer analysis, thermal diffusivity is the thermal conductivity divided by density and specific heat capacity at constant pressure. It measures the rate of transfer of heat of a material from the hot end to the cold end. It has the SI derived unit of m2/s.

The formula is:

where
  is thermal conductivity (W/(m·K))
  is specific heat capacity (J/(kg·K))
  is density (kg/m3)
Together,  can be considered the volumetric heat capacity (J/(m3·K)).

As seen in the heat equation,

one way to view thermal diffusivity is as the ratio of the time derivative of temperature to its curvature, quantifying the rate at which temperature concavity is "smoothed out". Thermal diffusivity is a contrasting measure to thermal effusivity. In a substance with high thermal diffusivity, heat moves rapidly through it because the substance conducts heat quickly relative to its volumetric heat capacity or 'thermal bulk'.

Thermal diffusivity is often measured with the flash method. It involves heating a strip or cylindrical sample with a short energy pulse at one end and analyzing the temperature change (reduction in amplitude and phase shift of the pulse) a short distance away.

Thermal diffusivity of selected materials and substances

See also
 Heat equation
 Laser flash analysis
 Thermodiffusion
 Thermal effusivity
 Thermal time constant

References

Heat transfer
Physical quantities
Heat conduction